Curt John Ducasse (7 July 1881 – 3 September 1969) was a French-born American philosopher who taught at the University of Washington and Brown University.

Career

Ducasse was born in Angoulême, France. He obtained A.B. and A.M. degrees in philosophy from University of Washington. In 1912, he obtained his PhD from Harvard University.

He is most notable for his work in philosophy of mind and aesthetics. His influence can be seen in the work of Roderick Chisholm and Wilfrid Sellars. Ducasse served as the president of the Eastern division of the American Philosophical Association (1939–40) and president of the Philosophy of Science Association (1958–61).

Ducasse was influenced by William James and Josiah Royce.

Parapsychology

Ducasse wrote on parapsychology. He joined the American Society for Psychical Research in 1951 and served a term as vice president beginning in 1966.

His book A Critical Examination of the Belief in a Life After Death is a philosophical attempt to examine the idea of life after death. In it he expressed his belief in survival. The book was praised by parapsychologists. Criticism came from philosopher Corliss Lamont who asserted that some of the content was based on wishful thinking.

Ducasse was a believer in reincarnation. Science writer Martin Gardner observed that Ducasse was notable for "combining nonbelief in God with a belief in the preexistence and the afterlife of human souls."

Publications 
 Ducasse, Causation and the Types of Necessity, (1924)
 Ducasse, The Philosophy of Art, (1929)
 Ducasse, Philosophy as a Science,  (1941)
 Ducasse, Art, the Critics, and You,  (1944)
 Ducasse, Is a Life After Death Possible?, (1948)
 Ducasse, Nature, Mind, and Death, (1951)
 Ducasse, A Philosophical Scrutiny of Religion, (1953)
 Ducasse, A Critical Examination of the Belief in a Life after Death, (1961)
 Ducasse, Truth, Knowledge, and Causation, (1968)

References

Further reading
Frederick C. Dommeyer. (1966). Current Philosophical Issues: Essays in Honor of Curt John Ducasse. Thomas.
P. H. Hare and Edward H. Madden. (1975). Causing, Perceiving and Believing: An Examination of the Philosophy of C. J. Ducasse. Springer.
Barry, Jay, Gentlemen Under the Elms, Brown University, 1982.  (Chapter 10 is a profile and biography of Ducasse, with photographs).

External links
 
 Biography from Brown.edu

1881 births
1969 deaths
20th-century American essayists
20th-century American male writers
20th-century American philosophers
21st-century American essayists
21st-century American male writers
21st-century American philosophers
21st-century French essayists
21st-century French male writers
Action theorists
American logicians
American male essayists
American male non-fiction writers
French emigrants to the United States
American spiritual writers
Analytic philosophers
Brown University faculty
American consciousness researchers and theorists
Epistemologists
Harvard University alumni
Metaphysicians
Metaphysics writers
Near-death experience researchers
Ontologists
Parapsychologists
Phenomenologists
Philosophers of art
Philosophers of identity
Philosophers of logic
Philosophers of mind
Philosophers of religion
Philosophers of science
Philosophy academics
Presidents of the American Philosophical Association
Reincarnation researchers
University of Washington College of Arts and Sciences alumni
Writers about religion and science
Writers from Angoulême